Cyril Edgar Norris (December 23, 1902 – April 20, 1982) was a Canadian rower, born in Toronto, who competed in the 1928 Summer Olympics.

In 1928 he won the bronze medal as member of the Canadian boat in the eights competition.

External links
Edgar Norris' profile at databaseOlympics
Edgar Norris' profile at Sports Reference.com

1902 births
1982 deaths
Rowers from Toronto
Canadian male rowers
Olympic rowers of Canada
Rowers at the 1928 Summer Olympics
Olympic bronze medalists for Canada
Olympic medalists in rowing
Medalists at the 1928 Summer Olympics